Raputiarana is a genus of flowering plants belonging to the family Rutaceae.

Its native range is Costa Rica to Southern Tropical America.

Species:

Raputiarana heptaphylla 
Raputiarana subsigmoidea

References

Zanthoxyloideae
Zanthoxyloideae genera